Lincoln Institute may refer to:
Abraham Lincoln Institute, Maryland, US
Lincoln Institute (Kentucky), a former high school near Louisville, US
Lincoln Institute of Health Sciences, now part of La Trobe University in Melbourne as of 1987
Lincoln Institute of Land Policy, a think tank in Cambridge, Massachusetts, US
Lincoln Institute (Missouri), now Lincoln University, Missouri, US

See also
Lincoln College (disambiguation)
Lincoln University (disambiguation)
Lincoln School (disambiguation)